The Sturza is a right tributary of the river Putna in Romania. It passes through the city of Focșani and flows into the Putna near Răstoaca.

References

Rivers of Romania
Rivers of Vrancea County